Shurjeh Rural District is a rural district (dehestan) in the Central District of Sarvestan County, Fars Province, Iran. At the 2006 census, its population was 4,311, in 1,004 families.  The rural district has 7 villages.

References 

Rural Districts of Fars Province
Sarvestan County